Canna is a given name and surname. Notable people with the name include:

Saint Canna, 6th-century Welsh saint and Breton princess
Achille Canna (born 1932), Italian basketball player
Carlo Canna (born 1992), Italian rugby union player
Nobutoshi Canna (born 1968), Japanese voice actor